John Fielding (1721–1780) was an English magistrate and social reformer.

Other notable people named John Fielding include:

John Williams (VC) (1857–1932), a Welsh soldier and recipient of the Victoria Cross, born John Fielding
John Fielding (footballer, born 1939), English footballer, winger for Brentford, Southport and Grimsby Town
John Fielding (footballer, born 1982), English footballer, defender for York City